The Chevrolet Corvair Monza GT (XP-777) was a mid-engined experimental prototype automobile built in 1962 and based on the early model Chevrolet Corvair series. As it was essentially a concept car, the Monza GT did not enter production.

Design and development
In response to consumer advocate Ralph Nader's Unsafe at Any Speed, Chevrolet began developing a front-engine, front-wheel drive version of the Corvair; GM design chief Bill Mitchell repurposed the project by moving the transaxle to the rear, resulting in a mid-engine Corvair derivative. Under Mitchell's direction, the Corvair Monza GT coupe was designed by Larry Shinoda and Tony Lapine in 1962, borrowing from the Bertone designed Testudo concept car. Like the earlier design, the GT doors swung upward and were actually a front hinged canopy that extended into the B section; the rear engine cover also hinged at the rear. Unlike the production rear-engined Corvair, the GT engine was mounted ahead of the transaxle, resulting in a mid-engine layout. The chassis, designed by a team led by Frank Winchell, featured a  wheelbase,  shorter than the production Corvair.

Besides its streamlined appearance, the Monza GT had innovative features, including magnesium-alloy wheels, 4-wheel disc brakes, 4-wand fixed seats with adjustable pedals. These features would eventually turn up in production cars, years later.

History
Introduced to the public in June 1962 at Elkhart Lake at a Sports Car Club of America race for A- and B-production classes, the Corvair Monza GT was an instant hit with enthusiasts. Reporters called the car "gorgeous."

The Chevrolet Corvair Monza GT coupe toured together in early 1963 with the related Monza SS (Super Spyder, XP-797), styled as a roofless version of the GT, making a further public appearance at the New York International Auto Show. Although both cars were fundamentally based on existing Corvair drivetrain components and resembled each other externally, each represented a separate development of the Corvair design. In the Monza SS, the six-cylinder/six-carburetor engine was left in its stock location behind the transaxle, allowing a shorter  wheelbase. Like the XP-777/Monza GT, the XP-797/Monza SS chassis was developed by Winchell's team and the body was styled by Mitchell's Studio X team (Shinoda and Lapine).

Both the Monza GT and SS ended up as concepts only, tied partly to the fortunes of the Corvair, which fell after the vehicle had been declared unsafe by pioneering consumer advocate Ralph Nader. Mitchell remarked in 1985 that he "wanted something more exotic, so I built the one where the hatch came up (the Monza GT) and it's still a beautiful car, but it was heavy. Then I built the open job (the Monza SS). GM just couldn't see putting that out, but it went around to shows everywhere." Chevrolet began developing the Monza GT/SS into a production car under XP-782 with a targeted release year of 1966, but the production version never came to fruition.

Today, the Corvair Monza GT concept car is one of more than 700 vehicles found in the GM Heritage Collection of historically significant vehicles.

Influence and legacy
The cars used for the World of Tomorrow car ride attraction at Disneyland were based on the styling of the Corvair Monza GT.

The 1963 Corvette GS-II was derived from the mid-engine chassis of the Monza GT, again by Winchell's team. The GS referred to the Zora Arkus-Duntov-led Corvette Grand Sport program of 1962; two examples were built: GS-IIa, which was powered by a 327-cu.in. V8, and GS-IIb, which used a lightweight chassis and reportedly achieved  at Jim Hall's Rattlesnake Raceway test track. The GS-II was styled again by Larry Shinoda. Hall's Chaparral 2C race car was in turn derived from the GS-IIb, which remained in Midland, Texas, mostly forgotten until it was subsequently put on display starting from 2018 at the Chaparral wing of the Permian Basin Petroleum Museum.

Some of the styling features of the GT, notably the rear end, were the inspiration for the 1965–1969 Corvair. According to Pontiac Motor Division engineer Bill Collins, the division borrowed heavily from the Corvair Monza GT design when it developed both the coupe and convertible versions of its 1964 Banshee prototype cars. The design would also influence the 1965 Chevrolet Mako Shark II concept car and the 1968–1982 Corvette (C3) that clearly resembled it, three years later.

References

External links 

 Ludvigsen, Karl. Corvair by Chevrolet: Experimental & Production Cars 1957–1969 (Ludvigsen Library). Hudson, Wisconsin: Iconografix, 2002. .

Cars introduced in 1962
Cars powered by boxer engines
Corvair Monza GT